Alajangi Veerabhadra Swamy (14 January 1929 – 31 December 2019) was an Indian politician from the Odisha state. He was elected to the Rajya Sabha the Upper house of Indian Parliament from Odisha as an Independent candidate. Swamy died on 31 December 2019, at the age of 90, 14 days before his 91st birthday and several years after suffering a stroke.

References

External links
A. V. Swamy Rajya Sabha Profile 

1929 births
2019 deaths
Rajya Sabha members from Odisha
People from Nabarangpur district
Independent politicians in India